The 2014–15 Bulgarian Cup was the 33rd official season of the Bulgarian annual football knockout tournament. The competition began on 23 September 2014 with the matches of the First Round and finished with the final on 28 May 2015. Ludogorets Razgrad were the defending champions, but lost to Levski Sofia in the semifinals.

Cherno More Varna, the winner of the competition, qualified for the second qualifying round of the 2015–16 UEFA Europa League.

Participating clubs
The following teams competed in the cup:
(Teams still active are in bold)

First round 
The draw was conducted on 10 September 2014. The games will be played on 23–25 September 2014. On this stage all of the participants start their participation i.e. the 12 teams from A PFG (first division), the 16 teams from the B PFG (second division) and the 4 winners from the regional amateur competitions.

Second round 
The draw was conducted on 2 October 2014. The first legs are to be played on 28, 29 October 2014 and 15 February 2015, the second legs should be on 3, 6 December 2014 and 22 February 2015. On this stage the participants will be the 16 winners from the first round.

First legs

Second legs

Quarter-finals 
The draw was conducted on 16 December 2014. The first legs were played on 21/22 February and 4 March, the second legs were on 4 and 18 March 2015. On this stage the participants are the 8 winners from the third round.

First legs

Second legs

Semi-finals 
The draw was conducted on 19 March 2015. The first legs will be played on 8 April, the second legs are on 29 April 2015. On this stage the participants will be the 4 winners from the Quarterfinals.

First legs

Second legs

Final

See also
 2014–15 A Group
 2014–15 B Group
 2014–15 V AFG

References

Bulgarian Cup seasons
Bulgarian Cup
Cup